Route 76 or Fort Weaver Road is a major north–south highway on the island of Oahu which begins at Interstate H-1 (H-1) in Waipahu and ends in Ewa Beach.

Route description
Route 76 is the main thoroughfare from the Ewa Beach community to H-1. Along the route is an intersection with Farrington Highway, Hawaii Medical Center West, West Loch Golf Course, Ewa Gentry, Laulani Park and Holomua Elementary School.

History
Fort Weaver Road was completed in June 1982.

Major intersections

References

External links

Route Log on Hawaii Route 76

0076
Transportation in Honolulu County, Hawaii